Peter Ceffons (French: Pierre Ceffons, Latin: Petrus de Ceffons Clarevallensis; fl.1340s) was a French Cistercian theologian and scholastic philosopher, who became Abbot of Clairvaux. He is considered an early humanist for his style.

He lectured on the Sentences at Paris in the late 1340s, using angle as a metaphor. He was influenced by Adam Wodeham, Gregory of Rimini and John of Mirecourt.

He wrote a satirical work Epistola Luciferi ad Cleros, an attack on the secular clergy; it is dated to 1352.

References

 D. Trapp, Peter Ceffons of Clairvaux, Recherches de Theologie ancienne et medievale, XXIV (1957), 101-154
 Jorge J. E. Gracia, Timothy B. Noone, A Companion to Philosophy in the Middle Ages (2003), p. 508.

Notes

14th-century French Roman Catholic priests
French Cistercians
Medieval French theologians
Scholastic philosophers
French abbots